The Carer may refer to:
 The Carer (film), a 2016 British-Hungarian comedy film
 The Carer (novel), a 2019 novel by Deborah Moggach